Builth Wells Rugby Football Club is a Welsh rugby union team based in Builth Wells. Today, Builth Wells RFC play in the Welsh Rugby Union, Division Two West Central League. Builth Wells RFC are a feeder club for Cardiff Blues.

The club badge shows a bull charging beneath a rugby post. Builth is thought to be a corruption of Llanfair Ym Muallt (buallt), meaning the Church of St. Mary in the Cow Pasture. The original bull was white.

Past honours
2012–13 WRU Division Two West - Champions
2008–09 WRU Division Two West - Promoted Runners-up
2003–04 WRU Division Two East - Champions

Notable former players
The following players have represented Builth Wells and have been capped at international level.
  Jeremy Pugh
  Mark Jones

References

Welsh rugby union teams
1888 establishments in Wales
Rugby clubs established in 1888
Sport in Powys